How Voters Feel is a 2013 book by Stephen Coleman, Professor of Political Communication at the University of Leeds.

About
The book is about hidden genealogies of democracy, and particularly its most widely recognized act which is voting. The book looks at a unique insight into how it feels to be a democratic citizen. The book is based on in-depth research involving 60 interviews with voters and non-voters.

References

2013 non-fiction books
Books about democracy
Cambridge University Press books